Rock & Roll is an EP by Frank Turner, released on 6 December 2010 on Xtra Mile Recordings. Describing the release as "a taster" for his subsequent studio album, England Keep My Bones, the EP was preceded by the single, "I Still Believe".

Writing and composition
Regarding the EP's overall aesthetic, Turner noted, "If the music I make is a spectrum that has acoustic folk stuff at one end, and rock music at the other, with Poetry of the Deed the needle was over towards the rock end. That's fine to do on occasion, but I think that as a general thing I’d rather be somewhere a bit more in the middle. So that’s the idea with Rock and Roll, and with the new album as well; the idea is to pull things back a little bit."

Track listing

Personnel
 Frank Turner - lead vocals, lead Guitar, mandolin
 Ben Lloyd - electric guitar
 Matt Nasir - piano, keyboards, vocals
 Tarrant Anderson - bass
 Nigel Powell - drums, percussion, vocals

Additional personnel
Tristan Ivemy - recording, mixing
Frank Arkwright - mastering

Artwork
Chris Bourke - woodcuts
Matt Nasir - photographs
Andy Black - photographs
Casey Cress - photographs

References

2010 EPs
Frank Turner albums
Xtra Mile Recordings EPs